Elsa Jacobsen (born 16 March 1995) is a Faroese football midfielder who currently plays for Argja Bóltfelag.

External links 
 

1995 births
Living people
Faroese women's footballers
Faroe Islands women's youth international footballers
Faroe Islands women's international footballers
Women's association football midfielders
Havnar Bóltfelag players